Goulds Fork is a  long 3rd order tributary to Brown Creek in Anson County, North Carolina.

Variant names
According to the Geographic Names Information System, it has also been known historically as:  
Little Browns Creek

Course
Goulds Fork rises about 3 miles southwest of Wadesboro, North Carolina.  Goulds Fork then flows north to meet Brown Creek about 2.5 miles south of Ansonville, North Carolina.

Watershed
Goulds Fork drains  of area, receives about 47.9 in/year of precipitation, has a topographic wetness index of 435.21 and is about 64% forested.

References

Rivers of North Carolina
Rivers of Anson County, North Carolina
Tributaries of the Pee Dee River